Bleeding in pregnancy may refer to:

Early pregnancy bleeding, which is bleeding before 24 weeks gestational age
Obstetrical bleeding, which is bleeding that occurs after 24 weeks gestational age including the postpartum period